Warming Up! is an album by American jazz pianist Billy Taylor featuring tracks recorded in 1960 and released on the Riverside label. The recordings were first released as Custom Taylored on a SESAC "electronic transcription" to promote SESAC-controlled material to radio stations and re-released as Easy Like on the Surrey label in 1966.

Reception

Allmusic awarded the album 3 stars.

Track listing
All compositions by Billy Taylor except as indicated
 "Warming Up" - 2:29 
 "Easy Like" (Teddy Castion, Taylor) - 2:36 
 "That's Where It Is" - 2:45 
 "Native Dancer" - 2:31 
 "Coffee Break" - 3:05 
 "Afterthoughts" - 2:51 
 "Easy Walker" - 2:46
 "Lonesome Lover" - 2:29 
 "Don't Bug Me" - 2:36 
 "You Know What I Mean" - 3:04 
 "Uncle Fuzzy" - 2:36
 "No Aftertaste" - 3:08

Personnel 
Billy Taylor – piano
Henry Grimes – bass
Ray Mosca – drums

References 

1960 albums
Billy Taylor albums
Riverside Records albums
Albums produced by Esmond Edwards